The 2004–05 Scottish First Division was won by Falkirk.

As league champions, Falkirk were promoted to the Scottish Premier League. Partick Thistle and Raith Rovers were relegated to the Second Division, and Second Division winners Brechin City and Stranraer were promoted.

League table

Top scorers

Attendances
The average attendances for Scottish First Division clubs for season 2004/05 are shown below:

References

Scottish First Division seasons
1
2004–05 in Scottish football leagues
Scot